The Grand Panorama of a Whaling Voyage 'Round the World is a maritime panoramic painting created by Benjamin Russell and Caleb B. Purrington in 1848. At 1,275 feet in length, it is the longest painting in the United States, longer than the Empire State Building is tall.

History 

Benjamin Russell was a notable whaling painter of New Bedford, while Caleb Purrington was a more simple sign painter. The panorama was first displayed in 1848. It was displayed on a proscenium stage, mounted on spools and manually cranked to wind the panorama along, typically accompanied by narration, music, and lighting effects.

Description 
The panorama exists in four sections and depicts a whaling voyage around the world in the first half of the 19th century. The Wall Street Journal described it as "surprising in its variety and beauty."

Restoration 
Part of the restoration included spraying the painting with diluted adhesive in order to bind the pigment to the cloth and humidify the canvas.

After its restoration, it was displayed in four sections in a gallery exhibition called "A Spectacle in Motion" at the Kilburn Mill in New Bedford, Massachusetts from July 14 to October 8, 2018. As part of the exhibition, and to protect the fragile canvas from further wear, the New Bedford Whaling Museum created a digital video of the panorama show, now viewable on YouTube.

References 

1848 paintings
Panoramic art
Maritime paintings
Whaling